Daigakumae Station (大学前駅) is the name of three train stations in Japan:

 Daigakumae Station (Nagano)
 Daigakumae Station (Shiga)
 Daigakumae Station (Toyama)